KDGW may refer to:

 Converse County Airport (ICAO code KDGW)
 KDGW-LP, a low-power radio station (96.5 FM) licensed to serve Grants Pass, Oregon, United States